Nailor Azevedo (also known as Nailor Proveta) is a Brazilian clarinetist and saxophonist. Azevedo is a member of Banda Mantiqueira, which was nominated for a Grammy in 1998. He has performed with Benny Carter and Anita O'Day. He plays Brazilian choro and samba as well as traditional jazz.

References

Living people
Brazilian saxophonists
Male saxophonists
Brazilian clarinetists
Year of birth missing (living people)
21st-century saxophonists
21st-century clarinetists
21st-century male musicians